Stevie Wonder: The Definitive Collection is a compilation album, released in 2002, by American singer Stevie Wonder. It was released in the United Kingdom as a 38-track, two-disc compilation.

Track listings
All songs written by Stevie Wonder, except where noted.

UK single disc/US release

^ - 7" version on the UK single disc pressing

UK release

NOTE: In 2003, the set was re-released with a re-recorded version of "Signed, Sealed, Delivered I'm Yours" featuring Blue and Angie Stone.

Japan release

Standard

Deluxe edition

Charts and certifications

Weekly charts

Year-end charts

Certifications

References

Further reading
Stevie Wonder interview by Pete Lewis, 'Blues & Soul' March 1995

2002 compilation albums
Stevie Wonder compilation albums
Motown compilation albums
Universal Music Group compilation albums
Albums produced by Clarence Paul
Albums produced by Henry Cosby
Albums produced by Stevie Wonder